The Dechatu River is a river of eastern Ethiopia. It is unclear if either its flow or river bed eventually reach the Awash. The river appears to lose itself in the Cantur Plain (Buren Meda) north of Dire Dawa.

Floods
The river floods periodically during the June-to-September rainy season. In 2005 around 200 people were killed by floodwaters and crocodiles. A flood in August 2006 killed at least 300, including 200 in the city of Dire Dawa.  The city suffered large amounts of damage and thousands of its inhabitants were displaced.  Communications infrastructure was damaged and the main road to the capital Addis Ababa was cut off .
On 24th of April, 2020 , as a result of  heavy rain in the upland catchment, the Decchatu  river has killed 4  people and left 2 residents with heavy injuries, more than 30  houses are washed away.

See also 
List of Ethiopian rivers

References

Rivers of Ethiopia